An album is defined by the Official Charts Company (OCC) as being a type of music release that features more than four tracks and lasts longer than 25 minutes; during the 1960s, sales of albums in the United Kingdom were compiled by several different magazines, including New Musical Express (NME), Record Retailer, Melody Maker, Disc and Record Mirror. The UK Albums Chart was first officially published in February 1969 when Record Retailers and the BBC jointly commissioned the British Market Research Bureau (BMRB) to record sales of albums. For dates between March 1960 and February 1969, the albums chart produced by Record Retailer is regarded by the OCC as being canonical to the UK Albums Chart; for dates before March 1960, the OCC considers the albums chart created by NME to be canonical. The biggest-selling album of the 1960s was Sgt. Pepper's Lonely Hearts Club Band by The Beatles—of the top thirteen biggest-selling albums of the decade, ten were by The Beatles, the other three being motion picture soundtracks.

Albums

References
General (chart positions)

Specific

1960s
1960s (UK)
1960s in British music
British record charts